"Just Be Good to Me" is a song by the S.O.S. Band, written and produced by Jimmy Jam and Terry Lewis for their fourth studio album, On the Rise (1983). "Just Be Good to Me" was released as the lead single from On the Rise in March 1983, by Tabu Records.

Production 

The song's percussion and beats were produced using a Roland TR-808 drum machine.

Critical reception 
Daryl Easlea of Record Collector called "Just Be Good to Me" a "barnstorming electro-soul anthem". Amy Hanson of AllMusic described the song as "showstopping".

Covers and samples 

The song has subsequently been covered by several artists, including Deborah Cox (whose version reached number eight on the US Hot Dance Club Play chart), Mariah Carey (who performed it live on her 1993 Music Box Tour and 1996 Daydream Tour), Shayne Ward (who recorded it for his 2007 album, Breathless), and Faithless in 2008 in a collaboration with Dido. In 2008, Australian artist Seany B released a version of this song, but called it "B Good 2 Me".  Cher Lloyd performed it on series seven of The X Factor. In 2011, the song was performed by Simone Battle on series one of The X Factor (US).

Tupac also sampled the track during the making of his 1995 album, Me Against the World, for track number 7, "Heavy in the Game" Ft. Lady Levi and Richie Rich. The song was also sampled by rapper Silkk the Shocker for his 1998 single "Just Be Straight with Me", which also features Destiny's Child.  Fatboy Slim was involved with a very successful UK version with his band Beats International, who took the song to number one as "Dub Be Good to Me", which features a backing track consisting mainly of a sample of The Clash classic "The Guns of Brixton". In 2010, Professor Green and Lily Allen released a cover reminiscent of Beats International's version titled "Just Be Good to Green".

In 2014, Usher quoted part of the lyrical melody in the song "She Came to Give It to You".  In 1991, MC Lyte also referenced the song on her track "Poor Georgie" from the studio album Act Like You Know.  In 2018, Cyantific released the album Bloodline which contains "Wild Child" featuring the lyrics from the song.

In 2006, the song was remixed by the band Karmah with a mash-up of a sample of "Every Breath You Take" by The Police.

Popular impact 
The song was featured on Richard Pryor's 1983 Live Concert Film, Richard Pryor Here and Now.

In 2008, the song was featured on Grand Theft Auto IV's fictional Soul/R&B radio station, The Vibe 98.8.

Charts

Weekly charts

Year-end charts

References 

1983 singles
1984 singles
The S.O.S. Band songs
Songs written by Jimmy Jam and Terry Lewis
Song recordings produced by Jimmy Jam and Terry Lewis
1983 songs
Tabu Records singles
Deborah Cox songs